Nedim Gürsel (born 5 April 1951 in Gaziantep) is a Turkish writer. In the late 1960s, he published novellas and essays in Turkish magazines. After graduating from Galatasaray High School in 1970, he studied at the Sorbonne. In 1974, he graduated from the Sorbonne's Department of Modern French Literature. In 1979, he received his doctorate in comparative literature after completing his dissertation on Louis Aragon and Nazim Hikmet. He returned to Turkey, but the unrest there in 1980 persuaded him to go back to France.

In 1976, Gürsel published A Summer without End, a collection of stories. For that collection, in 1977, Gürsel received Turkey's highest literary prize, the Prize of the Turkish Language Academy. After the 1980 Turkish coup d'état, a military tribunal charged that Gürsel's collection had slandered the Turkish army. In 1983, the Turkish military censored Gürsel's novel The First Woman. Although the Turkish authorities dismissed the charges against Gürsel, their actions made A Summer without End and The First Woman unavailable in Turkey for several years.

In 2008, Gürsel published The Daughters of Allah. The book prompted the Turkish authorities to charge Gürsel with insulting religion. In June 2009, a court in Istanbul acquitted Gürsel of the charge.

Gürsel is a founding member of the International Parliament of Writers. In 2019, he was the eleventh Friedrich Dürrenmatt Guest Professor for World Literature at the University of Bern. Today, a citizen of France, he teaches contemporary Turkish literature at the Sorbonne, and works as the research director on Turkish Literature at the International French Science Research Center (CNRS).

Gürsel's awards include:
1977, Prize of the Turkish Language Academy
1986, the Abdi Ipekçi Prix for his contribution to the bringing together of Greeks and Turks)
1986, the Freedom Award by French PEN Club
1987, Haldun Taner Citation (with Tomris Uyar and Murathan Munhan)
1990, The prize for best international scenario by Radio France Internationale
1992, Struga Gold Plaque Award
2004, France-Turquie Literary Prize “Fernand Rouillon”
2004, Art and Literature Chivalry by French Government.

Gürsel's works include:
Kadinlar Kitabi (The Book of Women), 1975
Uzun Sürmüs Bir Yaz (A Summer without End), 1976
Ilk Kadin (The First Woman), 1986 and 2004
Sevgilim Istanbul  (Istanbul My Love), 1986
Son Tramvay (The Last Tram), 1991
Saint Nazaire Günlügü (The Newspaper of Saint-Nazaire), 1995
Bogazkesen, Fatih’in Romani (The Conqueror), 1996
Balkanlara Dönüs (Return to the Balkans), 1995
Nâzim Hikmet ve Geleneksel Türk Yazisi (Nazim Hikmet and Turkish popular literature), 2000
Yasar Kemal (Yachar Kemal—the novel of a transition), 2000 and 2005
Aragon: Baskaldiridan Gerçege (The Perpetual Motion of Aragon—dadaïst revolt  with the real world), 2000
Sag Saglim Kavussak, Çocukluk Yillari (In the country of captive fish—a Turkish childhood), 2004
Allah'in Kizlari (The Daughters of Allah), 2008.

References

1951 births
Turkish expatriates in France
Turkish novelists
University of Paris alumni
Living people
People from Gaziantep